Maltese Episcopal Conference is the official Catholic bishops' meeting in the Republic of Malta. Its president, as of 2016 is Charles J. Scicluna, the Archbishop of Malta. The Conference of Bishops of Malta is a member of the Council of European Bishops' Conferences and the Commission of the Bishops' Conferences of the European Community.

Members
The members of the conference are: 
Archbishop Charles Scicluna (President and Archbishop of Malta)
Bishop Anton Teuma, (Bishop of Gozo) 
Bishop Joseph Galea-Curmi (Auxiliary Bishop of Malta)
Archbishop Paul Cremona (Archbishop Emeritus of Malta)
The secretary is Fr Jimmy Bonnici.

Working bodies

The Conference has the following committees and administrative groups:
 Commission for Liturgical Affairs
 Commission for the Church in Malta and Europe
 Commission for Education
 Commission for the preservation of Christian culture
 National Council on Philanthropy and charitable assistance
 Council for the Promotion of the priestly vocation
 Office to investigate sexual abuse
 Regional court of second instance

See also

Catholic Church in Malta
Culture of Malta
History of Malta 
List of Churches in Malta
Religion in Malta

References

External links
 http://maltadiocese.org/archbishops-curia?l=1&lang=en

Malta
Catholic Church in Malta